The Champion of Champions is a professional non-ranking snooker tournament. It was held in 1978 and 1980 and was then revived in 2013 by Matchroom Sport. The reigning (2022) champion is Ronnie O'Sullivan, taking his record fourth win in the competition.

The Champion of Champions features winners of World Snooker events over the preceding 12 months, with the field topped up, if necessary, from the current World Rankings. In 2020, the tournament had a prize fund of £440,000, of which £150,000 went to the winner.

History
The event was created in 1978 by boxing promoter Mike Barrett. The event was contested by four players at the Wembley Conference Centre in London, England. It was played over two days with the semi-finals on the first day and the final on the second day. World Champion Ray Reardon beat the Masters winner Alex Higgins 11–9 in the final. Brief highlights were shown on ITV's World of Sport on the following afternoon.

The event was not held in 1979 but appeared again in 1980 at the New London Theatre in Drury Lane, London but in a different format. Ten players competed in the tournament, split into two groups. Each group played a round robin with the winners of the groups advancing to the final. Doug Mountjoy beat John Virgo 10–8 in the final. The tournament was then abandoned since the audiences had been poor and the event financially unsuccessful.

The event was revived in 2013 by Matchroom Sport, replacing the Premier League Snooker on the calendar. The event was held in November at the Ricoh Arena in Coventry and contested by 16 of the world's leading players. The event was broadcast live in the United Kingdom on ITV4. The 2013 and 2014 tournaments were both won by Ronnie O'Sullivan but he chose not to defend the title in 2015. In 2015, Neil Robertson defeated Mark Allen by 10–5 to claim his first title in this tournament. In 2016, John Higgins beat O'Sullivan 10–7 in the final. O'Sullivan was beaten by Shaun Murphy in the 2017 final, but he took back the trophy in 2018 after beating Kyren Wilson 10–9. Robertson beat Judd Trump in the 2019 final to win the event for the second time. The 2020 final was a repeat of the final of the 2015 edition of the event, but this time Allen defeated Robertson 10–6. In 2021, Trump won 10–4 against Higgins.

As a result of the global COVID-19 pandemic, the 2020 edition of the tournament was relocated to the Marshall Arena in Milton Keynes in order to create a secure bubble, the same as all other snooker tournaments played in that season. The 2021 edition was played in Bolton for the first time, featuring a change to the dress code, where all players had special shirts with their name on the back: this change was met with mixed response by the players.

Winners

References

External links
 

 
1978 establishments in England
Recurring sporting events established in 1978
Snooker non-ranking competitions
Snooker competitions in England